Baccharis huairacajensis is a species of flowering plant in the family Asteraceae. It is endemic to Ecuador. Its natural habitat is subtropical or tropical moist montane forests. It is threatened by habitat loss.

References

huairacajensis
Endemic flora of Ecuador
Near threatened plants
Taxonomy articles created by Polbot
Plants described in 1901